Knoelle is a genus of spiders in the family Lycosidae. It was first described in 2006 by Framenau. , it contains only one species, Knoelle clara.

References

Lycosidae
Monotypic Araneomorphae genera
Spiders of Australia